Artibonite (French) or Latibonit (Haitian Creole) is one of the ten departments of Haiti located in central Haiti. With an area of 4,887 km2 it is Haiti's largest department. As of 2015, its estimated population was 1,727,524. The region is the country's main rice-growing area. The main cities are Gonaïves (the capital) and Saint-Marc. In February 2004 an insurgency tried unsuccessfully to declare Artibonite's independence.

Etymology 
The name L'Artibonite is derived from the Artibonite River the longest river on the Quisqueya island. L'Artibonite is derived from the Taino word Ja'tibonicu' meaning The Great High Place of the Sacred Waters. Under Toussaint's administration of the island, the department was known as Toussaint's Department.

History

Taino Period
During that period the actual department seats between the three casicas of Marien, Maguana, and Xaragua. The border between those chiefdoms is assumed to be the Artibonite River. Although the department's capital Gonayibo is believed to have been part of the Xaragua chiefdom. 
Haitian traditional stories talk about the Taino Queen leaving annually followed by her nitaino her main city of Yaguana to go to Gonayibo and thus is the origin of Haitian Rara traditions.

Some Taino settlements in the departments are Gonaibo, Amani-y, the caves of Dondon and archeological places have been found in the Cote-des-Arcadins area.

French Period
Under the French administration the towns of St-Marc, L'Éstère. Mirebalais and Petite-Rivières-de-l'Artibonite were important french settlements with multiple plantations in the Valley.
During that period the town of St-Marc was under the control of the colonialists and was the seat of Assemblée Colonial or the Colonial Assembly.

Haitian Revolution
At the beginning of the Revolution, St-Marc was burned by Dessalines and Gonaives by Vernet under the order of Toussaint in response to Napoléon's tyrannic behaviors.
Later on, Toussaint defeated the French troops at the Bataille-de-la-Ravine-à-Couleuvre near the town of Gonaives. 
In Gonaives the French captured Toussaint and he was later sent to France and died.

In April 1802 during the siege of Crête-à-Pierrot that lasted almost one month, the Idigenes troops offer the French generals the greatest resistance. During that battle, Dessalines threatened to set fire to the gunpowder reserve in case the French would enter the fort. The Haitian hero Lamartinière surprised the French troops with her courageous behavior.

Haitian Period
Gabart commander of St-Marc, Vernet commander of Gonaives, and Dessalines commander of the Indigenous Army are signatories of the Haitian Declaration of Independence.
Gonayiv is the first city to be gained from the french troops by the Ingenious Army, and Gabart freed St-Marc on September 4, 1803.

On January 1, 1804, the city of Gonaives hold the first Haitian political conference and witness the Declaration of Independance under the eyes of Dessalines, Henry, Pétion, Geffrard, Boirond Tonnerre, some British troops and many more.
The town of Dessalines became the world's first black capital and the seat of the Haitian Empire.
Many times the Department dissociate itself from Port-au-Prince and the West many times notably under the leadership of Henry Christophe, Nissage Saget, receiving Fabre Geffrard against Faustin.
In the contemporary period, Gonaives rose furiously in 1986 and 2004 overthrowing both Duvalier and Aristide.

Geography 
The department is bordered to the north by North and North-West, on the west the Gulf of Gonave, the south West and the east and Centre.
A core geographic feature of this department is the Artibonite River, which runs through the southern half of the department, allowing for rice cultivation in the Artibonite Valley.
The department has two mountain ranges running from NW to SE. On the North shore of the Valley is Black Mountain and on the south shore is Mattheux Mountain. 
The Bay of Gonaives is one of the best-protected bays in the country.
The Bay of St-Marc is the biggest U-shaped bay in the country.
The department doesn't have any major fault line through it.

Environnement 
South of Gonaives there is one of Haiti's biggest mangrove forests harboring flamingos and other rare species. There are also sand dunes in that area.
There are many lagoons and rivers that run through the Valley. Outside of Artibonite, the principal rivers are La Quinte in Gonaives, L'Éstère river, and St-Marc River. 
The biggest lake in that department is Bois-Neuf Lake south of St-Marc.

Economy 
The department has been in a state of economic decline since insurgencies and coups have reduced the nation's stability. Since the election of President René Garcia Préval, the production of rice and other crops has been increasing.
The biggest economical catastrophe in the department is the Clinton induce low-tariffs on rice coming from the US, destroying the local economy.

Nonetheless, the economic potentials are multiple and over multiple industries.

Tourism 
From St-Marc to Montrouis the coastal area is known for its breathtaking beaches and potential for resort tourism. Some of the most notable beaches are Amani-y, Grosse-Roche, Decameron, Moulin-sur-Mer and more. 

Cultural tourism focusing on Haitian history, forts, and Vodoun.

Agriculture and Fishing 
The Valley is known as Haiti's food basket. Until the 1980's Haiti was able to be self-sufficient.
Many families have farm animals such as pigs, goats, beef, chicken, and more.

Mining 
Gonaives is a point of interest for mining notably in the disaffected mines of Sedren.

Salt Production 
Grande-Saline and Anse-Rouge are known for their Haitian Sea Salt production.

Energy 
Haiti's biggest electrical dam is also used to control the flow of the Artibonite.

Transport 
The main road through the Department is the RN1 connecting Okap to Pòtoprens, passing through Gonayiv and Sen-Mak. This road often causes congestion in Sen-Mak since it goes through the city.
The RN5 connects Gonayiv to Gwomòn.
The RD103 and RD304 connect Gonayiv to Ench and the Haitian-Dominican border.
The RD101 and RD301 connect Sen-Mak to Mibalè and the Haitian-Dominican border.

Both St-Marc and Gonaives are port towns harboring ships.

The Artibonite river is navigable by small rafts called kannòt and even jet skies

The department has no international airport although Gonaives has a small airway.

Health  
Population health in Haiti has suffered from political instability and natural disasters. The Hôpital Albert Schweitzer Haiti is located in Deschapelles, Haiti. Established in 1956, it has grown to provide health care in the hospital and clinics to the Artibonite region with a budget of $6 million in 2015. In addition to founder Dr. Larry Mellon, notable figures in its history include Dr Harold May, Founder and President of FAMILY, Inc. (Fathers and Mothers, Infants, eLders, and Youth).  In the Verrettes commune, FAMILY seeks to promote sustainable development. In addition, U. S. Tuskegee University has partnered with FAMILY to establish the FAMILY Tuskegee Institute of Haiti to develop academic and vocational training in the areas of forestry, agriculture and health care.

Trow other major hospitals are St-Nicolas in St-Marc and The Providence in Gonaives.

Historic Places and Landmarks 
Several noteworthy events of the Haitian Revolution took place in the Artibonite Department.
 Gonaïves: the City of Independence
 Ravine-à-Couleuvre: site of the famous battle between Major General Toussaint Louverture and French troops commanded by Rochambeau.
 Petite Rivière de l'Artibonite: where Henry Christophe built his palace with 365 doors.
 Fort de La Crête-à-Pierrot: site of the Battle of Crête-à-Pierrot between Haitian rebels and French troops.
 Habitation Georges: site of Major-General Toussaint Louverture's arrest.
 Dessalines (formerly Marchand): Capital of the First Empire.
 Vieux Bac: near Grande-Saline where Toussaint Louverture defeated Colonel Brisbane in December 1794.
Deschapelles, in the Artibonite Valley, is the location of the Hôpital Albert Schweitzer.
 Saint Marc, in the Artibonite Valley, is the Origin of soldiers who were sent to Savannah, Georgia USA in 1779 to fight for the Port of Savannah.
Fort Blockhaus (Blòkòs) and Diamond (Djanman) in Saint-Marc
Henry's castle ruin in Saint-Marc

Other facts:
 Dessalines and Maire-Claire got married in St-Marc
 After the execution of a St-Marc officer in Sansousi Palace, the city rebelled against the crown leading to the King's suicide in October 1820.

 Demography 
The 2015 population of Artibonite was estimated at 1,727,524 (2015), with 739,787 (43%) residing in urban areas and (57%) residing in rural areas.

Due to its importance, Artibonite is the second most populated department in Haiti. After the 2010 Earthquake, many families left the West for Artibonite.
The department can better be subdivided into 3 distinct regions:
 The Horn or North'Artibonite that serves a buffer with the N-O, the Gros-Morne arrondissement
 Artibonite Proper or the northside of the Valley
 Lower-Artibonite or southside of the Valley, the St-Marc arrondissement

 Culture 
It is also a hub in haitian machete fencing, cuisine with diri a lalo and has multiple colonnial time forts.

Administrative divisions
The Department of Artibonite is subdivided into five arrondissements, which are further subdivided into sixteen communes.Dessalines ArrondissementDesdunes
Dessalines
Grande Saline
Petite Rivière de l'ArtiboniteGonaïves ArrondissementEnnery
L'Estère
GonaïvesGros-Morne ArrondissementAnse-Rouge
Gros-Morne
Terre-NeuveMarmelade ArrondissementMarmelade
Saint-Michel-de-l'AtalayeSaint-Marc Arrondissement'''
La Chapelle
Saint-Marc
Verrettes
Montrouis
Liancourt

References

 
Departments of Haiti